The women's 200 metres event at the 1979 Summer Universiade was held at the Estadio Olimpico Universitario in Mexico City on 10, 11 and 12 September 1979.

Medalists

Results

Heats

Wind:Heat 1: 0.0 m/s, Heat 2: 0.0 m/s, Heat 3: +0.3 m/s, Heat 4: +0.3 m/s

Semifinals

Wind:Heat 1: -0.4 m/s, Heat 2: -0.1 m/s

Final

Wind: +1.9 m/s

References

Athletics at the 1979 Summer Universiade
1979